Anabel is a feminine given name. It is the Spanish version of Annabel. Notable people with this given name include:

 Anabel Alonso (born 1964), Spanish comedy actress
 Anabel Conde (born 1975), Spanish singer
 Anabel Gambero (born 1972), former field hockey defender
 Anabel Medina Garrigues (born 1982), Spanish tennis player
 Anabel Moro (born 1979), Argentine Paralympic swimmer

See also
 Anabelle
 Annabelle (given name)

External links
 Behind the Name

Spanish feminine given names